Super Friends is a 1973 animated series produced by Hanna-Barbera and National Periodical Publications. It is based on the Justice League comic books, and is the first incarnation of the Super Friends series.

Main characters
Super Friends first aired on ABC on September 8, 1973, featuring DC superheroes Superman, Batman and Robin, Wonder Woman, and Aquaman. Superman, Batman and Aquaman had each previously appeared in their own animated series produced by Filmation, and voice talent from these prior programs was brought over to work on the new show. Shortly before the Super Friends series was developed, Superman and Wonder Woman also guest-starred in two episodes of The Brady Kids, while Batman and Robin appeared in two episodes of The New Scooby-Doo Movies.

In addition to the superheroes, a trio of sidekicks was introduced, each being new characters not drawn from the comic books: Wendy Harris (voiced by Sherri Alberoni), Marvin White (voiced by Frank Welker), and Wonder Dog, none of whom had any special abilities (save Wonder Dog’s unexplained intelligence and ability to talk). Wendy and Marvin were depicted as detectives and/or superheroes in training.

Format and episode formula
Each episode would begin with the heroes responding to an emergency detected by the massive TroubAlert computer that was situated within the Hall of Justice which served as the headquarters of the team. Colonel Wilcox, a U.S. Army official, was a recurring character who would work as a government liaison to the Super Friends during emergencies.

As such conflicts are often ultimately resolved with the antagonists persuaded to adapt more reasonable methods to achieve their aims with the assistance of the heroes. Natural disasters triggered by human (or alien) activity were often shown, and environmental themes featured strongly in the program.

Guest stars
Some guest stars from the broader Justice League were featured during this season including the Flash, Plastic Man, and Green Arrow.

Plastic Man made his animated debut in a cameo appearance in the episode "Professor Goodfellow’s G.E.E.C." voiced by Norman Alden. Superman calls him in to extract a mouse from a computer system.

Green Arrow appeared in the episode "Gulliver's Gigantic Goof" and was voiced by Norman Alden. He was referred to as a "Staunch member of the Justice League of America."

Cast
 Sherry Alberoni - Wendy Harris, Polly Lean (in "The Fantastic Frerps"), Museum Patron (in "The Planet-Splitter")  
 Norman Alden - Aquaman, Green Arrow (in "Gulliver's Gigantic Goof"), Plastic Man (in "Professor Goodfellow's G.E.E.C"), Astronaut (in "Gulliver's Gigantic Goof"), Pilot (in "Gulliver's Gigantic Goof"), Guard (in "The Planet-Splitter"), Joe (in "The Power Pirate"), King Plasto (in "The Fantastic Frerps")
 Danny Dark - Superman, Android Superman (in "The Androids"), Train Engineer (in "The Power Pirate"), Speaker (in "The Power Pirate")  
 Shannon Farnon - Wonder Woman, Martha Kent (in "The Planet-Splitter"), Lara (in "The Planet-Splitter"), Mrs. Caldwalader (in "The Planet-Splitter"), Woman (in "The Baffles Puzzle")
 Casey Kasem - Robin, Jor-El (in "The Planet-Splitter"), Professor Goodfellow (in "Professor Goodfellow's G.E.E.C."), Colonel (in  "Professor Goodfellow's G.E.E.C."), Professor Von Noalot (in "Too Hot to Handle"), Twisty (in "The Balloon People"), Mike Rosecope (in "The Fantastic Frerps"), Mac M (in "Menace of the White Dwarf"), Dr. Hiram Gulliver (in "Gulliver's Gigantic Goof"), Pvt. Smith (in "Gulliver's Gigantic Goof"), Wilbur (in "The Planet-Splitter"), Guard (in "The Planet-Splitter"), Young Alien (in "The Watermen"), Jack (in "The Power Pirate"), TV News Reporter (in "The Power Pirate"), Professor Baffles/ Mr. Mergen (in "The Baffles Puzzle"), Von Knowalot (in "Too Hot to Handle") 
 Ted Knight - Narrator, The Flash (in "Too Hot to Handle"), Power Pirate/Anthro (in "The Power Pirate"), Captain (in "The Power Pirate"), Kolbar (in "Too Hot to Handle"), Mr. Singh (in "Too Hot to Handle")   
 Olan Soule - Batman, Jonathan Kent (in "The Planet-Splitter"), Dave (in "The Power Pirate"), First Mate (in "The Power Pirate"), Farmer (in "Too Hot to Handle"), Man (in "Too Hot to Handle")
 John Stephenson - Colonel Wilcox, Sir Cedric Cedric (in "The Power Pirate"), Alien (in "The Power Pirate"), Mr. Huggins (in "Professor Goodfellow's G.E.E.C"), Grunk (in "The Balloon People"), King Plasto (in "The Fantastic Frerps"), Security Chief (in "The Baffles Puzzle"), Lupis (in "Too Hot to Handle")
 Frank Welker - Marvin White, Wonder Dog, Mr. Darby (in "The Baffles Puzzles"), Android Wonder Dog (in "The Androids"), Mr. Huggins (in "Professor Goodfellow's G.E.E.C."), Loco (in "The Androids"), Styro (in "The Fantastic Frerps"), Creature (in "The Mysterious Moles"), Igor (in "Gulliver's Gigantic Goof"), Holo (in "The Watermen"), Bill (in "The Power Pirate")

Cancellation
This first run of Super Friends, consisting of sixteen one-hour episodes that were rerun several times, concluded on August 24, 1974. At this point, the series was cancelled and did not appear on the fall lineup for 1974.

Home media
Warner Home Video (via Hanna-Barbera Productions, DC Entertainment and Warner Bros. Family Entertainment) released Super Friends! - Season One, Volume One on DVD in Region 1 on January 5, 2010. Volume One was a 2 disc set of the first eight episodes of the series at a retail price of $26.99. the Season One, Volume One set of the original 1973 series of Super Friends was presented in its original, uncut hour-long version, just as they originally aired on ABC. On July 20, 2010 they released Volume Two which was also a 2 disc set and contained the remaining eight episodes of the series.

Episodes

References

External links
Super Friends at Big Cartoon DataBase

1973 American television series debuts
1973 American television series endings
1970s American animated television series
1970s American science fiction television series
American Broadcasting Company original programming
Super Friends
Animated Batman television series
Animated Justice League television series
Animated Superman television series
Wonder Woman in other media
Television series by Hanna-Barbera
Television series set in 1973
American children's animated action television series
American children's animated adventure television series
American children's animated science fantasy television series
American children's animated superhero television series
Animated television shows based on DC Comics
English-language television shows